Walkaway Joe is a 2020 American drama film directed by Tom Wright in his feature directorial debut. The film stars David Strathairn, Jeffrey Dean Morgan, Julian Feder, and Julie Ann Emery. It tells the story of an unlikely friendship between a young boy searching for his father and a wandering loner hiding from his past.

Cast
Jeffrey Dean Morgan as Cal McCarthy
David Strathairn as Joe Haley
Julian Feder as Dallas McCarthy
Julie Ann Emery as Gina McCarthy
Evan Gamble as Chris
Andrea Frankel as Becka
Robert Walker-Branchaud as Earl

Production
Filming began in October 2018 in St. John the Baptist Parish, Louisiana.

Release
The film was released on digital and VOD on May 8, 2020, by Quiver Distribution.

Reception
Christy Lemire of RogerEbert.com awarded the film one and a half stars.  Hunter Lanier of Film Threat gave the film a 2 out of 10.

References

External links
 
 

2020 films
2020 directorial debut films
2020 drama films
2020 independent films
2020s drama road movies
2020s English-language films
American drama films
American drama road movies
American independent films
Cue sports films
Films about friendship
Films scored by Christophe Beck
Films scored by Jake Monaco
Films shot in Louisiana
Films shot in Ohio
Quiver Distribution films
2020s American films